Gougeon is a surname. Notable people with the surname include:

 Denis Gougeon (born 1951), Canadian composer and music educator
 Jan Gougeon, American sailboat designer
 Gougeon 32, American catamaran design by Jan Gougeon
 Joel Gougeon (born 1943), American politician